…At a Loss is the third album by American sludge metal band Buzzoven, released on May 5, 1998, by Off the Records. The album was reissued in 2010 on vinyl and CD through Emetic Records.

Track listing

"Left Behind" ends at 7:34 with the final half hour ending in one droning, vibrating guitar effect with the main riff playing very softly in the background.

Personnel
"Reverend Dirtkicker aka Kirk Oven" – vocals, guitar
"Dixie" – bass, vocals
"Simple" – drums
Billy Anderson – production, engineering
Jeremy Dubois – additional engineering
Arik Moonhawk Roper – cover art
T.roy sourvein – samples

References

Buzzoven albums
1998 albums
Albums produced by Billy Anderson (producer)